Akhmanov is a Slavic masculine surname; its feminine counterpart is Akhmanova. It may refer to the following notable people:

Alexey Akhmanov (1897–1949), Soviet Army lieutenant general 
Anna Akhmanova (born 1967), Russian-born biologist

Russian-language surnames